Thailand is a country at the centre of the Indochinese peninsula in Southeast Asia. The Thai economy is the world's 20th largest by GDP at PPP and the 27th largest by nominal GDP. It became a newly industrialised country and a major exporter in the 1990s. Manufacturing, agriculture, and tourism are leading sectors of the economy. The economy is heavily export-dependent, with exports accounting for more than two-thirds of gross domestic product (GDP). Thailand exports over US$105 billion worth of goods and services annually.

Substantial industries include electric appliances, components, computer components, and vehicles. Thailand's recovery from the 1997–1998 Asian financial crisis depended mainly on exports, among various other factors. , the Thai automotive industry was the largest in Southeast Asia and the 9th largest in the world. The Thailand industry has an annual output of near 1.5 million vehicles, mostly commercial vehicles.

For further information on the types of business entities in this country and their abbreviations, see "Business entities in Thailand".

Largest firms 

This list shows firms in the Fortune Global 500, which ranks firms by total revenues reported before 31 March 2017. Only the top five firms (if available) are included as a sample.

Notable firms 
This list includes companies with headquarters in Thailand. The industry and sector follow the Industry Classification Benchmark taxonomy. Organizations which have ceased operations are included and noted as defunct.

See also 

 Media of Thailand
 Stock Exchange of Thailand
 Economy of Thailand

References 

 
Thailand

ja:Category:タイの企業